Jan Baptist Jozef de Bay, known as Jozef de Bay and Jean Baptiste Joseph de Bay the Elder, signed as De Bay Père (Mechelen, 16 October 1779Paris, 1863) was a Flemish sculptor, museum conservator and art restorer. After training in Mechelen, Nantes and Paris,  he spent most of his active career in France where he executed many portrait sculptures in a classicist style.  He became conservator of the collection of antique sculptures of the Louvre.

Life

He was the son of Philippus de Bay (1754–1810) and his wife Anna Catharina Taeymans. De Bay was a pupil of Willem Egidius van Buscum and Jan Frans van Geel in Mechelen and subsequently Antoine-Denis Chaudet at the École des Beaux-Arts de Paris. He was active in France where he first worked in Nantes from 1801.  From 1817 he was in Paris where he became in conservator of the collection of antiquities of the Louvre.

He was awarded various distinctions including the titles of Knight of the Legion of Honour and Knight of the Order of Leopold.

In Paris he provided support and training to visiting sculptors from Mechelen such as Joseph Tuerlinckx and Louis Royer.  He was the father of the sculptor Jean-Baptiste Joseph Debay (1802–1862) and the sculptor and painter Auguste-Hyacinthe Debay.

He died in Paris in 1863.

Work
He is mainly known for portrait sculptures of historical and contemporary figures.  His work was executed in a classicist style.

References

External links

1779 births
1863 deaths
Artists from Mechelen
Flemish sculptors (before 1830)
19th-century Belgian sculptors
19th-century Belgian male artists
Writers from Mechelen